Bankole Adekuoroye (born 16 February 1996) is a Nigerian football midfielder who plays for 2. liga club Partizán Bardejov.

Club career

ŠKF iClinic Sereď
Adekuoroye made his Fortuna Liga debut for iClinic Sereď against Ružomberok on 21 July 2018.

Adekuoroye requested and was granted a release from the club in January 2021.

References

External links
 
 
 Futbalnet profile 

1996 births
Living people
People from Ondo State
Nigerian footballers
Nigerian expatriate footballers
Association football midfielders
FK Spišská Nová Ves players
ŠKF Sereď players
MFK Zemplín Michalovce players
Partizán Bardejov players
Slovak Super Liga players
2. Liga (Slovakia) players
Expatriate footballers in Slovakia
Nigerian expatriate sportspeople in Slovakia